In enzymology, a plasmanylethanolamine desaturase is an enzyme that catalyzes the chemical reaction

O-1-alkyl-2-acyl-sn-glycero-3-phosphoethanolamine + AH2 + O2  O-1-alk-1-enyl-2-acyl-sn-glycero-3-phosphoethanolamine + A + 2 H2O

The 3 substrates of this enzyme are O-1-alkyl-2-acyl-sn-glycero-3-phosphoethanolamine, an electron acceptor AH2, and O2, whereas its 3 products are O-1-alk-1-enyl-2-acyl-sn-glycero-3-phosphoethanolamine, the reduction product A, and H2O.

This enzyme belongs to the family of oxidoreductases, specifically those acting on paired donors, with O2 as oxidant and incorporation or reduction of oxygen. The oxygen incorporated need not be derive from O miscellaneous.  The systematic name of this enzyme class is O-1-alkyl-2-acyl-sn-glycero-3-phosphoethanolamine,hydrogen-donor:oxy gen oxidoreductase. Other names in common use include alkylacylglycerophosphoethanolamine desaturase, alkylacylglycero-phosphorylethanolamine dehydrogenase, dehydrogenase, alkyl-acylglycerophosphorylethanolamine, 1-O-alkyl-2-acyl-sn-glycero-3-phosphorylethanolamine desaturase, and 1-O-alkyl 2-acyl-sn-glycero-3-phosphorylethanolamine desaturase.  This enzyme participates in ether lipid metabolism.  It requires NADPH.

Plasmanylethanolamine desaturase used to be described as an orphan enzyme, that is one whose activity is known but whose identity (gene, protein sequence) is unknown. It has now been identified and corresponds to protein CarF in bacteria and TMEM189 in humans (and animals). It contains the pfam10520 lipid desaturase domain which has 8 conserved histidines and which is also found in FAD4 plant desaturases. Mice lacking plasmanylethanolamine desaturase lack plasmalogens in their tissues and have reduced body weight.

References 

 
 
 
 
 

EC 1.14.99
Manganese enzymes
Magnesium enzymes
Enzymes of unknown structure